Egon Johansen (25 December 1917 – 8 July 2003) was a Danish footballer. He played in ten matches for the Denmark national football team from 1940 to 1947.

References

External links
 

1917 births
2003 deaths
Danish men's footballers
Denmark international footballers
Place of birth missing
Association footballers not categorized by position